The novice round open was only held once in the 1976 Summer Paralympics. Both men and women competed.

Men's novice round open

Men's novice and tetraplegics round team A-C

Women's novice round open 

Defunct events at the Summer Paralympics
Archery at the Summer Paralympics